R' Kiz  or Rkiz is a town and urban commune in the Trarza Region of south-western Mauritania.

In 2000 it had a population of 10,688.
It is located to the north of the lake of the same name.

References

Communes of Trarza Region